Galiana may refer to:
Guliana, Gujrat, alternative name for town in Punjab, Pakistan
Galiana (Redemption Ark), a character from the 2002 science fiction novel Redemption Ark